Wading River may refer to:

Wading River (Massachusetts), a tributary of the Three Mile River in southeastern Massachusetts
Wading River (New Jersey), a tributary of the Mullica River in southern New Jersey
Wading River, New York, a hamlet in Suffolk County, New York